Oliver Kieffer (born August 27, 1979 in Nanterre, Hauts-de-Seine) is a French volleyball player, who won the bronze medal with the France men's national volleyball team at the 2002 World Championships. Standing at 200 m, he plays as a middle-blocker.

References
 FIVB Profile

1979 births
Living people
People from Nanterre
Volleyball players at the 2004 Summer Olympics
Olympic volleyball players of France
French men's volleyball players
Sportspeople from Hauts-de-Seine